Lineodes ochrea is a moth of the family Crambidae. It has only been recorded from Kauai, Oahu, Molokai and Hawaii, but might be an introduced species in Hawaii.

The larvae feed on eggplants.

External links

Moths described in 1907
Spilomelinae